Eduardo Alfonso Sánchez Hernández (born 30 October 1946) is a Mexican politician serving as Deputy of the LIX Legislature of the Mexican Congress and representing Veracruz.  He was formerly affiliated with the Institutional Revolutionary Party.

References

1946 births
Living people
Politicians from Veracruz
Institutional Revolutionary Party politicians
Deputies of the LIX Legislature of Mexico
Members of the Chamber of Deputies (Mexico) for Veracruz